The coal mining communities, or coal towns of McDowell County, West Virginia were situated to exploit the area's rich coal seams. Many of these towns were located in deep ravines that afforded direct access to the coal through the hillsides, allowing mined coal to be dropped or conveyed downhill to railway lines at the valley floor. Many of these encampments were set up as company towns, and when their mines closed, the towns vanished.  McDowell County covers much of the Flat Top-Pocahontas Coalfield and a small portion of the Williamson Coalfield.

Flat Top-Pocahontas Coalfield

 Algoma
 Anawalt
 Asco (abandoned)
 Ashland
 Bartley
 Berwind
 Big Four
 Bishop
 Bradshaw
 Capels
 Caretta
 Carswell
 Cherokee
 Crumpler
 Cucumber
 Davy
 Eckman (abandoned)
 Eight (abandoned)
 Elbert
 Elkhorn
 English
 Excelsior
 Filbert
 Gary
 Gilliam
 Hartwell currently called Vallscreek
 Havaco
 Hemphill
 Jed
 Jenkinjones
 Keystone
 Kimball
 Landgraff
 Leckie
 Maitland
 Maybeury
 Mohegan (abandoned)
 Northfork
 Pageton
 Powhatan
 Premier
 Ream
 Superior
 Switchback
 Thorpe
 Twin Branch
 Venus
 Vivian
 War
 Warriormine
 Welch
 Wilcoe
 Yukon (abandoned)

Williamson Coalfield

 Iaeger
 Litwar
 Panther

References

.
Pocahontas Coalfield
Geography of McDowell County, West Virginia
Ghost towns in West Virginia